Peter Stephen Popovich (November 27, 1920 – March 29, 1996) was an American lawyer, politician, and judge from Minnesota.  He is the only person in the state's history to serve as both Chief Judge of the Minnesota Court of Appeals and Chief Justice of the Minnesota Supreme Court.

Early life and education
Popovich was born in Crosby, Minnesota in 1920.  He earned degrees from the University of Minnesota and William Mitchell College of Law (then the St. Paul College of Law) in 1942 and 1947, respectively.

Career
He was in private practice in the Twin Cities from 1947 to 1983, while also serving in the Minnesota House of Representatives from 1953 to 1963.

Upon the creation of the state Court of Appeals in 1983, Governor Rudy Perpich appointed Popovich to be Chief Judge.  Perpich elevated him to the Supreme Court in 1987, and named him Chief Justice in 1989.  Popovich resigned as chief justice in late 1990, having reached mandatory retirement age.

Following his retirement from the Supreme Court, Popovich joined the Minneapolis law firm of Briggs & Morgan.

Death
He died in early 1996 at the age of 75.

External links 
The Judicial Career of Peter Popovich
Popovich on Mandatory Retirement of Judges
Chief Justice Peter Popovich Obituary - Minneapolis Star-Tribune: March 30, 1996
Peter S. Publications - Popovich, Associate Justice, 1987-1989; Chief Justice 1989-1990
Minnesota State Law Library: Peter S. Popovich

1920 births
1996 deaths
People from Crosby, Minnesota
University of Minnesota alumni
William Mitchell College of Law alumni
Minnesota lawyers
Democratic Party members of the Minnesota House of Representatives
Chief Justices of the Minnesota Supreme Court
Minnesota Court of Appeals judges
Minnesota state court judges
20th-century American judges
20th-century American politicians
20th-century American lawyers